The Gogodala–Suki or Suki – Aramia River languages are a small language family of Papua New Guinea, spoken in the region of the Aramia River.

Languages
The languages are:
 Gogodala–Suki family
 Suki language
 Gogodala (Aramia River) branch: Gogodala, Ari, Waruna

Gogodala–Suki languages and respective demographic information listed by Evans (2018) are provided below.

{| 
|+ List of Gogodala–Suki languages
! Language !! Location !! Population
|-
| Suki || north-central Morehead Rural LLG || 3,500
|-
| Gogodala || Gogodala Rural LLG || 26,000
|-
| Ari || Gogodala Rural LLG || ?
|-
| Waruna || Gogodala Rural LLG || ?
|}

Reconstruction

Phonology
The reconstructed sound system is,

It's not clear that there was *w or *j distinct from *u and *i.

Pronouns
Free pronouns and object prefixes are:

{| 
! !!sg!!pl
|-
!1
|*nɛ||*sɛ
|-
!2
|*ɛ||*dɛ
|-
!3
|*o(-b)|| ?
|}

{| 
! !!sg!!pl
|-
!1
|*n-||*s-
|-
!2
|*-||*d-
|-
!3
|*-||*d-
|}

(2sg and 3sg is zero.)

Lexicon
Proto-Suki–Aramia (i.e., Proto-Gogodala–Suki) lexical reconstructions by Usher (2020) are:

{| class="wikitable sortable"
! gloss !! Proto-Suki-Aramia
|-
| 1 sg. || *nɛ
|-
| 2 sg. || *ɛ
|-
| 3 sg. || *o(-b)
|-
| 1 pl. || *sɛ
|-
| 2 pl. || *dɛ
|-
| again || *goarma
|-
| and/with || *da
|-
| animate ref. || *-te
|-
| be/live || *e[r]
|-
| breast || *bu
|-
| eat || *na
|-
| fat/grease || *sap[e/ɛ]
|-
| fire || *ir[a]
|-
| garden || *ega[d]
|-
| girl || *sua
|-
| give to 3 sg. || *ata
|-
| heavy || *mene
|-
| know || *it[a/o]ua
|-
| language || *gi
|-
| leaf || *bagu
|-
| locative || *-m
|-
| louse || *amu
|-
| man || *dar[o/a]
|-
| mouth || *magat
|-
| night || *is[ɛ/a]
|-
| nose || *min
|-
| other || *et[a/o]
|-
| path || *na...
|-
| penis || *o
|-
| see || *ti
|-
| skin/bark || *kakar
|-
| stative || *-[V]taka
|-
| tail || *uani
|-
| this/here || *mɛ-m
|-
| tooth || *poso
|-
| tree || *[e]i
|-
| wallaby/meat || *[u]kapu
|-
| what?/who? || *p[a]oa
|-
| where?/to || *bɛ
|-
| wing || *it[e/a]
|-
| woman || *ato
|-
| yesterday/tomorrow || *[ɛ/a]n[ɛ/a]p
|}

Vocabulary comparison
The following basic vocabulary words are from McElhanon & Voorhoeve (1970), Voorhoeve (1970), and Reesink (1976), as cited in the Trans-New Guinea database:

{| class="wikitable sortable"
! gloss !! Ari !! Gogodala !! Suki
|-
! head
| gabi || ganabi || tibodu
|-
! hair
| tiːta || tita || nigbagu
|-
! ear
| etubada; kɛso || igibi || iakadgu
|-
! eye
| tokodaba || tao || itumku
|-
! nose
| ndogu || mina || umuku
|-
! tooth
| mɛnəpila || poso || tamki
|-
! tongue
|  || mɛlɛpila || 
|-
! leg
| gupi ||  || 
|-
! louse
| ikami || ami || daka
|-
! dog
| sokɛ || soke || ebme
|-
! pig
|  || uai || kuainu
|-
! bird
| soma ||  || 
|-
! egg
| momona ||  || 
|-
! blood
| dede ||  || 
|-
! bone
| mboige || gosa || budu
|-
! skin
| kakala; puka || kaka || kaka
|-
! breast
| omo || omo || 
|-
! tree
| yei ||  || riku
|-
! man
| dalagi || dala; dalagi || daru; guargia
|-
! woman
| atogi || ato; susɛgi || atu
|-
! sun
| gadepa || kadɛpa || kamgu
|-
! moon
| tɔkɔ ||  || 
|-
! water
| ogo || wi || 
|-
! fire
| awa || ila || araka
|-
! stone
| -nadi ||  || 
|-
! road, path
| nape || nabidi || napru; rapru
|-
! name
| enoma || gagi || yaka
|-
! eat
| na- || na || 
|-
! one
| maitaia ||  || 
|-
! two
| saki ||  || 
|}

Evolution
Gogodalic-Suki formed a branch of Trans–New Guinea languages in the classification of Malcolm Ross. Possible reflexes of proto-Trans-New Guinea (pTNG) etyma are:

Gogodala language:
omo ‘breast’ < *amu
magata ‘mouth, jaw’ < *maŋgat[a]
mele-pila ‘tongue’ < *mele-mbilaŋ
imu ‘eye’ < *(ŋg,k)amu
mi ‘louse’ < *iman, *niman
kadepa ‘sun’ < *kand(a,e)pa
ila ‘tree, fire’ < *inda
na- ‘eat’ < *na-
mana- ‘sit, stay’ < *mVna-

Suki language:
gigoa ‘cassowary’ < *ku(y)a
na- ‘eat’ < *na-

References

Further reading
Reesink, G.P. "Languages of the Aramia River Area". In Reesink, G.P., Fleischmann, L., Turpeinen, S. and Lincoln, P.C. editors, Papers in New Guinea Linguistics No. 19. A-45:1-38. Pacific Linguistics, The Australian National University, 1976.

External links 
 Timothy Usher, New Guinea World, Proto–Suki – Aramia River

 
Papuan Gulf languages
Language families
Languages of Western Province (Papua New Guinea)